Simon Roberts may refer to:

 Simon Roberts (actor), British actor
 Simon Roberts (photographer) (born 1974), British socio-documentary photographer
 Simon Roberts (Herefordshire cricketer) (born 1983), English cricketer, played for Herefordshire 2002–09
 Simon Roberts (Cambridge cricketer) (born 1926), South African cricketer, played for Cambridgeshire and Cambridge University in the 1940s
 Simon Roberts (Australian cricketer) (born 1985), Australian cricketer
 Simon Roberts (footballer) (1876–1908), Australian rules footballer
 Simon Roberts (businessman) (born 1971), managing director of Boots UK & ROI
 Simon Roberts (Formula One) (born 1962), Formula One team principal